Georges Speicher (8 June 1907 – 24 January 1978) was a French cyclist who won the 1933 Tour de France along with three stage wins, and the 1933 World Cycling Championship.

After Speicher had won the 1933 Tour de France, he was initially not selected for the 1933 UCI Road World Championships. Only after a French cyclist that had been selected dropped out, Speicher was brought in as a replacement at the last notice, and won the race. Speicher was the first cyclist to win the Tour de France and the World Championship in the same year.

Career achievements

Major results

1931
Paris-Arras
1932
10th Tour de France:
1933
 World road race championship
Tour de France:
 Winner overall classification
Winner stages 8, 9 and 12
1934
Tour de France:
Winner stages 1, 5, 6, 13 and 20
1935
 national road race championship
Paris-Rennes
Paris-Angers
Tour de France:
6th place overall classification
Winner stage 13B
1936
Alger
Paris–Roubaix (victory contested by Romain Maes)
1937
 national road race championship
1939
 national road race championship

Grand Tour results timeline

References

External links 

Official Tour de France results for Georges Speicher

French male cyclists
Tour de France winners
French Tour de France stage winners
UCI Road World Champions (elite men)
Cyclists from Paris
1907 births
1978 deaths